Jean Driancourt (1 January 1908 – 4 April 1989) was a French racing cyclist. He rode in the 1933 Tour de France.

References

1908 births
1989 deaths
French male cyclists
Place of birth missing